Cornwall is a rural locality in the Maranoa Region, Queensland, Australia.

References 

Maranoa Region
Localities in Queensland